Gabriel Henrique Lima Santos (born 26 December 2001), commonly known as Gazão, is a Brazilian professional footballer who plays as a defensive midfielder for Campeonato Brasileiro Série A club Grêmio.

Club career

Grêmio
Born in Apucarana, Brazil, Gazão joined the Grêmio's Academy at the age of 10 in 2012.

Career statistics

Club

References

External links

Profile at the Grêmio F.B.P.A. website

2001 births
Living people
Brazilian footballers
Association football defenders
Campeonato Brasileiro Série A players
Grêmio Foot-Ball Porto Alegrense players